Header is a 2006 horror film directed by Archibald Flancranstin, and written Michael E. Kennedy. It is based on the 1995 Verotik novel Header by Edward Lee.

Plot 

Imprisoned for involuntary manslaughter during a carjacking, Travis Clyde Tuckton is released from prison in 2003, and shacks up with his disabled grandfather, Jake Martin, in the old shoemaker's secluded West Virginia home. Jake elects to teach Travis everything he knows, starting with the family tradition of "headers"; the act of having sex with a hole drilled into a person's skull. Travis picks up a hitchhiker, and as Jake supervises, loses his "head humping" virginity to her. After killing a relative of a neighbor who had gotten into an argument with Jake, Travis vows to take revenge on all those who have wronged his family, declaring "An eye for an eye, and a head for a head!"

A parallel story concerns ATF agent Stewart Cummings, who has resorted to trafficking drugs in order to pay for his girlfriend Kathy's medicine. The plotlines intersect when Stewart investigates the mounting pile of header victims, with the evidence eventually pointing to Travis. After killing and robbing the two dealers he was carrying drugs for, Stewart picks up a hitchhiker, and asks her about Travis. The hitchhiker tells Stewart that Travis may be living with his grandfather, and gives him directions to Jake's cottage.

At the cottage, Travis kills Thibald Caudill, a man Jake claimed stole valuable land out from under their family, and killed Travis's parents (making it look like a car accident). Stewart walks in on Travis giving Thibald a header, and shoots both Travis and Jake, killing them. Stewart rushes back to his office, where he is told he is being arrested for murdering the drug dealers, one of whom was an undercover officer. A struggle ensues, and ends with Stewart shooting his superior and the arresting officer.

Stewart returns home, and discovers Kathy doing cocaine and having sex with her doctor, having been faking her illness to get drug money this entire time. Stewart snaps, kills the doctor, shoots Kathy in the knees, and gets a drill in preparation of giving her a header.

Cast 

 Stephen DeCaires as Young Travis
 Dick Mullaney as Jake Martin
 Christopher Woods as Travis's Paw
 Amanda Czelinski as Girl Running in Woods
 Jake Suffian as Agent Stewart Cummings
 Melody Garren as Kathy Crandel
 Jim Coope as Agent J.L. Peerce
 Kevin Dedes as Agent Chad Umbergy
 Elliot V. Kotek as Travis Clyde Tuckton
 Marc Raco as Prison Inmate
 Andrew Cowen as Spaz
 Lauren Devlin as Iree A. Reid
 Edward Lee as State Trooper #1
 Jack Ketchum as State Trooper #2
 Morris Fazzi Jr. as Nedder Kinney
 Patrick Nicholas as Dutch
 Stacey Brooks as Chessy Kinney
 Marcy J. Savastano as Dead Body in Field #1
 Lauren Gilray as Header Victim in Montage
 Alex Marthaller as Point Man
 Terri Radowsky as Dead Body in Field #2
 Tara Brooks as Betty Sue Morgan
 Ruth Maria Nicholas as Jan Beck
 Michael Philip Anthony as Truck Driver
 J. Malia Hawley as Sarah Dawn Slade
 Ruth Dimino as Hitchhiker
 Bill Corry as Thibald Caudill
 Colin Hoffmeister as Captain Philip Straker
 John A. Locke as Doctor Seymour

Reception 

A four out of five was awarded by Dread Central, which wrote "Header is a film in a class all its own, most likely because it scares the other students" and "Header takes its viewers on a dark, gritty, and uncomfortable journey to those places that most people would rather pretend don't exist. It is a cruel study of what humanity is capable of when the proper manipulation and motivation is involved". A half-star was given by DVD Talk, which concluded "Header is as stomach-churning as they come, but it's only on the surface: there's nothing genuinely unsettling about the film other than the massive number of problems hampering the final product".

References 
http://www.feoamante.com/Movies/GHI/Header.html

http://horrornews.net/9382/film-review-header-2006/

http://www.horrortalk.com/reviews/movie-reviews/407-header.html

External links 

 
 

2006 films
Necrophilia in film
American splatter films
2006 horror films
Adultery in films
Films about drugs
Films set in 1992
Films set in 2003
American exploitation films
American films about revenge
American serial killer films
American horror thriller films
Films shot in New York (state)
American independent films
Films set in West Virginia
Films based on American horror novels
American crime thriller films
2006 directorial debut films
2000s English-language films
2000s American films